Raymond Robbins may refer to:

 Raymond Robins (1873–1954), American economist and writer
 Raymond Francis Robbins (1912–1980), American artist